Afterglow is a compilation album released by Australian-New Zealander rock band Crowded House in 1999. It consists of outtakes, b-sides and other rarities recorded between 1985 and 1995. Seven of the songs were originally recorded for the Woodface album before Tim Finn became involved. 

The song "Left Hand" appears on Crowded House's live album Special Edition Live Album. "Help Is Coming" was the first released studio recording to feature drummer and co-writer Peter Jones, and was re-released in 2015 as a charity single for Syrian refugees.  "You Can Touch" was a bonus track for the Japanese edition of Together Alone.

Track listing

 *On all releases of Afterglow Mark Hart's name is missing from the writer's credits for the song Help Is Coming. His name is correctly mentioned on the label of the Help Is Coming charity single from 2015.

2016 Deluxe Edition 

Includes the original album plus disc two.

Note
 * Previously released

Charts

Weekly charts

Year-end charts

Certifications

Notes 

1999 compilation albums
Crowded House albums
B-side compilation albums
Capitol Records compilation albums
Compilation albums by Australian artists